Sarah (also known as Sarah (The Seventh Match) and Sarah and the Squirrel) is a 1982 Australian animated drama film. It was written by Elizabeth Kata and directed by Yoram Gross.

Unlike Yoram Gross's other works, Sarah deals with more mature subjects.

Plot
The story is about a little girl during the beginning of the Second World War. When the German soldiers invade, she and her family are forced to hide in the woods. When her grandmother gets sick, her father goes into town for medicine and disappears. Sarah goes out to pick berries and when she returns, the rest of her family is gone. Sarah is forced to survive alone in the woods with only the animals for company. One day she sees some resistance fighters attempt to destroy a bridge the Nazis use to transport weapons. When their attempt fails, she decides to destroy the bridge herself, hoping that her actions may end the war. Over time she is successful, but afterwards sadly realizes that what she has done will not end the war and walks away into the forest.

Voices
Mia Farrow – Sarah
Joan Bruce
John Faassen
Ron Haddrick
Shane Porteous

References

External links

Sarah at Oz Movies

See also
List of animated feature films
Grave of the Fireflies, a Japanese animated film that deals with a similar subject.

1980s Australian animated films
1982 films
1982 animated films
Australian animated feature films
Films directed by Yoram Gross
Australian World War II films
Works about children in war
1980s English-language films
1980s Australian films
Flying Bark Productions films